Aurora Cerilles ( Enerio; born September 17, 1949) is a Filipino politician. She was a former representative of the second (2nd) legislative district of the Province of Zamboanga del Sur to the House of Representatives of the Philippines. She is the spouse of Antonio Cerilles, governor of Zamboanga del Sur from 2010 to 2019. She switched positions with her husband and ran for Governor during the 2019 elections, but lost by almost 100,000 votes to former Representative Victor Yu of PDP Laban.

Education
She graduated from University of the East with a BS in  Business Administration degree.

See also
List of Governors in the Philippines
List of representatives elected in the Philippine House of Representatives elections, 2010

References

External links

|-

|-

|-

Living people
1949 births
Governors of Zamboanga del Sur
Members of the House of Representatives of the Philippines from Zamboanga del Sur
University of the East alumni
Women members of the House of Representatives of the Philippines
Lakas–CMD politicians
Women provincial governors of the Philippines